Señorita República Dominicana 1965 was held on February 20, 1965. There were 26 candidates who competed for the national crown. The winner represented the Dominican Republic at the Miss Universe 1965. Only the 25 province and 1 municipality entered. On the top 10 they showed their evening gown and answered questions so they could go to the top 5. In the top 5 they would answer more questions.

Results

Señorita República Dominicana 1965 : Clara Andrea Herrera Vallamon (Sánchez Ramírez)
1st Runner Up : Ana Cepeda (San Rafael)
2nd Runner Up : Miguelina Sandoval (Puerto Plata)
3rd Runner Up : Jeanette Montes (Santiago)
4th Runner Up : Marinela Sosa (Duarte)

Top 10

Mabel Cano (La Vega)
Isa de Lara (Distrito Nacional)
Veronica Beltran (San Juan de la Maguana)
Ada Vega (Espaillat)
Elisa Rosario (Salcedo )

Special awards
 Miss Rostro Bello - Miguelina Sandoval (Puerto Plata)
 Miss Photogenic (voted by press reporters) - Mabel Cano (La Vega)
 Miss Congeniality (voted by Miss Dominican Republic Universe contestants) - Ana Cepeda (San Rafael)

Delegates

 Azua - Ana Elbenira Tavarez Fermin
 Baoruco - Silvia Nines Aroyo Tatis
 Barahona - Yanet Ermania Langarge Peralta
 Ciudad Santo Domingo - Ana Victoria Reynosa Espinoza
 Dajabón - Elsa Ala Sousa Duarte
 Distrito Nacional - Isa Yulisa de Lara Cruz
 Duarte - Sandra Marinela Sosa Medina
 Espaillat - Ada Marlen Vega Enroyd
 La Altagracia - Martha Ceneyda Martes Fausto
 La Vega - Mabel Cristina Cano Morobel
 Monte Cristi - Tomasa Cortes Garca
 Nueva Era - Joana Reyna Alvarez Abreu
 Pedernales – Sandra del Carmen Lajara Reyes
 Peravia - Laura Mary Peralta Mena
 Puerto Plata - Miguelina Josefine Sandoval Duarte
 Salcedo - Elisa Magdalena Rosario Vargas
 Samaná - Evangelina Altagracia Reynosa Padron
 Sánchez Ramírez - Clara Andrea Herrera Vallamon
 San Cristóbal - Lisa Desiere German Gustav
 San Juan de la Maguana - Veronica Alejandra Beltran Goico
 San Pedro de Macorís - Lisia Varoni Ynoa
 San Rafael - Ana Karina Cepeda Tejeda
 Santiago - Jeanette Dotel Montes de Ocoa
 Santiago Rodríguez - Mireya Margarita Caceres Sosa
 Séibo - Ada Oliva Quiros Ruiz
 Valverde - Rachel Angelina Ramos Acosta

Trivia
Miss San Juan de la Maguana had daughter that enter Miss Dominican Republic Universe 2005.

Miss Dominican Republic
1965 beauty pageants
1965 in the Dominican Republic